The men's welterweight (−78 kilograms) event at the 2002 Asian Games took place on 11 October 2002 at Gudeok Gymnasium, Busan, South Korea.

A total of 14 men from 14 countries competed in this event, limited to fighters whose body weight was less than 78 kilograms. Oh Seon-taek of South Korea won the gold medal.

Schedule
All times are Korea Standard Time (UTC+09:00)

Results 
Legend
DQ — Won by disqualification
K — Won by knockout
R — Won by referee stop contest

References
2002 Asian Games Official Report, Page 723

External links
Official website

Taekwondo at the 2002 Asian Games